Ramon de Lima Saro (born 26 July 1991) is a Brazilian footballer who plays as a centre-back.

Career

Club
On 9 February 2019, Saro joined Dordoi Bishkek on trial.

International
On 19 January 2017, the Asian Football Confederation declared Saro and eleven other Brazilian footballers ineligible to represent East Timor. Two months later, the East Timorese passport he had received have been declared ‘null and void’ by the Ministry of Justice of East Timor.

International career

International goals
Scores and results list Timor-Leste's goal tally first.

References

1991 births
Living people
Footballers from São Paulo (state)
Brazilian footballers
Association football central defenders
Brazilian expatriate footballers
Brazilian expatriates in East Timor
Expatriate footballers in East Timor

Timor-Leste international footballers
East Timorese footballers
Expatriate footballers in Bahrain
Brazilian expatriate sportspeople in Bahrain
People from Taboão da Serra